The Thrills are an Irish rock band, formed in 2001 in Dublin, Ireland. The band was founded by lead vocalist Conor Deasy and guitarist Daniel Ryan, guitarist and bass player Padraic McMahon, pianist Kevin Horan and drummer Ben Carrigan. Their break came with their debut album, So Much for the City, which became an Irish number one and charted at number 3 on the UK. The band's sound has been described as "inspired by classic American pop of the late '60s and early '70s" by Rovi and "an ocean-soaked, harmony-heavy homage to California's dreamy dreams, shaking ground, and unrelenting sunshine" by Pitchfork Media.

Early history and So Much for the City

The Thrills were formed in the Dublin suburb of Blackrock in the mid-1990s, when neighbours Conor Deasy and Daniel Ryan formed the Cheating Housewives with friends Kevin Horan, Padraic McMahon and Ben Carrigan. Several of the members attended primary school together at Hollypark Boys School in Foxrock. In 1999, the band spent four months living in San Diego, during which time they wrote several of the tracks that would eventually appear on their debut album So Much for the City (such as "One Horse Town"). Upon returning to Dublin, they began writing and demoing more material, hoping to secure a record deal – which they soon did with local label Supremo Records, home of fellow Irish band Chicks. The relationship with Supremo produced no releases and was short-lived; when they were dropped by the label several months later, the band members pointedly chose not to inform their parents.

During a trip to San Francisco in 2001, the band decided to change their name to The Thrills. Later that year they recorded six songs over the span of two demos. The second demo made a favourable impression on Johnny Davis of Bright Star Recordings and BMG Publishing. Through Davis, indie label Rough Trade Records became aware of the band and was impressed, offering the Thrills the money to record another demo. The Rough Trade demo was recorded, but by then label interest in the band had grown rapidly, with up to thirty A&R men and record personnel attending the band's next musical showcase gig. In September 2002, The Thrills signed with Virgin Records, attracted by the promise of artistic freedom and the label's decision to allow them to record their debut record in Hollywood with producer Tony Hoffer (Beck, Air).

After releasing their debut EP in November 2002, the band flew to Los Angeles in December 2002 to record their debut album So Much for the City. So Much for the City was released in 2003, debuting at No. 1 in Ireland, No. 3 in the UK and going platinum in both the UK and Irish Album Charts. The album was nominated for the 2003 Mercury Prize but lost to Dizzee Rascal's 'Boy in da Corner'. The album also won the 2003 Q Award for Best New Act, and Best New Act at the 2003 Irish Meteor Awards.

In 2004 The Thrills won an EBBA Award. Every year the European Border Breakers Awards (EBBA) recognize the success of ten emerging artists or groups who reached audiences outside their own countries with their first internationally released album in the past year.

Let's Bottle Bohemia
The Thrills' second album Let's Bottle Bohemia was released in September 2004. It was recorded in L.A. (where their first album had also been recorded) – this time with Dave Sardy as producer, featuring orchestration by Van Dyke Parks and a guest mandolin performance by R.E.M.'s Peter Buck. The album enjoyed similar success to the band's debut, entering the charts at number one in Ireland and number nine in the U.K. – largely on the back of the single "Whatever Happened To Corey Haim?".

That same year, the band took part in the Band Aid 20 charity assemble, and performed the song "Santa Cruz (You're Not That Far)" at the Live 8 Edinburgh 50,000 - The Final Push charity concert, which is also featured on the DVD release of the event. The band also performed a medley with Ronnie Wood of their single "The Irish Keep Gatecrashing" and the Rod Stewart song "Maggie May" at the Irish Meteor Awards 2005.

The band performed a medley of songs from the album on the U.S. television series The OC in the episode entitled "The Ex-Factor".

Extended break and Teenager

The band took an extended break after their second album, in an effort to evolve their sound. New material was written, and recording sessions took place in New York during 2006. Failing to meet the band's standards, many of these new songs were ultimately discarded, and remain unreleased.

"We were definitely striving for a new standard," Deasy said in 2007. "We were willing to scrap months of work on songs, which is one of the reasons it took so long. We recorded maybe 30 songs." During an interview with indie music magazine Under The Radar in October 2007, Deasy stated: "We wrote about 30 songs for this album, and a lot of the songs we discarded. They weren’t poor songs. They were perfectly good songs, but they were songs that could have fit on the first or the second album a little too easily."

More new material was written, including "Midnight Choir" which became the opening track for Teenager and was also released as a single. At the suggestion of R.E.M., the five relocated to a renovated morgue (owned by Canadian musician Bryan Adams) in inner-city Vancouver to record their third album with Tony Hoffer, who had previously produced their debut album.

Teenager was released in Ireland on 22 July 2007 and Central Europe on 25 July 2007. It failed to light up the British and Irish charts and received generally positive reviews, getting a Metacritic score of 71%, positive reviews from the BBC, 7/10 from the NME, a 6.9/10 from Pitchfork and a 2/5 review from The Guardian. A special CD/DVD edition of Teenager – which contained a film-length documentary about the band entitled The Thrills: The End of Innocence – was given limited release in the UK only.

Post-Teenager

The band was dropped by EMI in 2008 after the poor performance of their Teenager album, which only charted at No. 48 in the UK.

In an August 2010 interview with the Irish Times, Ben Carrigan confirmed that the Thrills remain on indefinite hiatus. At the time, Carrigan was working on his debut solo record entitled The Greatest Narrators, which was released on 23 September 2011. The first single from this album ("You Knew It All Along") was released on 19 August 2011.

While promoting his album in September 2011, Carrigan said of the Thrills: "We’re just on a hiatus. We haven’t done anything since 2008, when we toured Australia. We never split up, but we're all working on other projects. In time, I'm sure we'll get back together. It just got a bit crazy for a while because we were away from home, so we needed to take a break." During an interview with Hot Press in late October 2011 Carrigan stated: "It's like a past life now, the whole Thrills thing, to be honest. Which is kind of nice because it’s good to always feel like you’re moving forward as opposed to looking back and wondering what might have been."

On 22 August 2011, Virgin Records (the Thrills' former label) released a 'best of' compilation entitled 2002–2007. The compilation contained no previously unreleased or bonus material; all the tracks had been previously released in the Thrills' first three studio albums. To date, 2002–2007 has not been released in stores; the disc is only available through Amazon's UK site. A digital-only edition is available on Amazon's US site.

Kevin Horan would join Little Green Cars as a touring member  with Daniel Ryan as their manager.

Discography

Studio albums

EPs

Singles

Other contributions
 WFUV: City Folk Live VII (2004) – "Santa Cruz"
 Music from the OC: Mix 2 (2004, Warner Bros./Wea) – "Big Sur"
 Eklektikos Live (2005) – "Say it Ain't So"
 The Acoustic Album (2006, Virgin) – "Santa Cruz"

References

External links
 

Irish indie rock groups
Music in Dublin (city)
Musical groups established in 2001
Virgin Records artists
People from Blackrock, Dublin